Macedonian First Football League Reserves Championship is an annual competition for the reserve teams of Macedonian First Football League clubs.

History
The competition was established in 2014.

External links
 Football Federation of Macedonia

Reserve football leagues in Europe
reserves
Reserves
Sports leagues established in 2014
2014 establishments in the Republic of Macedonia